In geology, a mazuku (Swahili for "evil wind") is a pocket of carbon dioxide-rich air that can be lethal to any human or animal life inside. Mazuku are created when carbon dioxide accumulates in pockets low to the ground. CO2 is denser than air, which causes it to flow downhill, hugging the ground like a low fog, and is also undetectable by human olfactory or visual senses in most conditions.

Mazuku can be related to volcanic activity or to a natural disaster known as a limnic eruption. In the first case, noxious gases are released from the Earth's crust into the atmosphere, whereas in the second case the gases originate deep in a lake and boil rapidly to the surface. Because of their nature as sporadic and subtle events, few mazuku have been recorded, but there is a growing understanding of them based on historical and fossil evidence.

Effects 

Mazuku can cause a variety of effects on flora and fauna in the regions in which they occur depending on the composition and concentration of the gases that they consist of. Massive clouds of CO2, such as those released from lakes in the 1980s, can cause widespread devastation of human and wildlife populations. However, they may have little or no effect on local vegetation. If the concentration of CO2 is high enough, and maintained in a prolonged outgassing event, even vegetation can succumb to the mazuku, as is the case on Mammoth Mountain in California, United States, where deforestation has occurred as well as CO2 poisonings, including the deaths of three ski patrollers in 2006.

Related events such as pyroclastic flows or limnic eruptions can cause the temperature of a mazuku to vary considerably from the natural environment. Reports of frostbite, condensation, and other temperature changes can occur. Because they are often accompanied by other cataclysmic events such as volcanic eruptions, landslides, and tsunamis, mazuku are not easy to identify as potential dangers in their own right.

In some cases, mazuku are large enough to cause a localized extinction event that is documented in the fossil record. Lake Kivu, on the border between the Democratic Republic of the Congo and Rwanda, is a very large lake that has a sediment record of repeated and regular massive lake turnover events that include methane explosions, tsunamis and mazuku. The Messel pit in Germany contains a fossilized extinction pattern that could be related to a mazuku event there during the Eocene epoch.

See also

References 

Geological hazards
Swahili words and phrases
Volcanic degassing